Adult Contemporary is a chart published by Billboard ranking the top-performing songs in the United States in the adult contemporary music (AC) market.  In 1967, 18 songs topped the chart, then published under the title Easy Listening, based on playlists submitted by easy listening radio stations and sales reports submitted by stores.

On the first chart of 1967, Frank Sinatra was at number one with "That's Life", which had been in the top spot since the previous week.  Sinatra, who was experiencing a career resurgence in his 50s, had the highest total number of weeks at number one by an artist in 1967, spending seven weeks in the top spot with the solo singles "That's Life" and "The World We Knew (Over and Over)" and a further nine weeks at number one with "Somethin' Stupid", a duet with his daughter Nancy.  "Somethin' Stupid"'s nine-week spell at the top was the longest unbroken run of the year at number one.  The song was also a crossover success, topping Billboards all-genres chart, the Hot 100, for four weeks.  In addition to Frank Sinatra, Ed Ames also had three Easy Listening number ones in 1967, reaching the top spot with "My Cup Runneth Over", "Time, Time" and "When the Snow Is on the Roses".  Nancy Sinatra, Al Martino and Herb Alpert & the Tijuana Brass were the only other acts with multiple chart-toppers during the year.

Two singles in 1967 had the unusual distinction of reaching number one on the Easy Listening chart but failing to enter the Hot 100 at all.  Both "It's Such a Pretty World Today" by Andy Russell and "Cold" by John Gary were Easy Listening chart-toppers but did not achieve sufficient crossover success to even reach number 100 on the Hot 100.  It would be more 30 years before another song would top the AC listing but fail to register on the Hot 100 despite being eligible to do so.  Russell's chart-topper came just two months after a recording of the same song by Wynn Stewart had reached number one on the Hot Country Singles chart.  "Cold" was the final number one of the year and would prove to be Gary's only Easy Listening chart-topper and his final entry on any Billboard chart.

Chart history

References

See also
1967 in music
List of artists who reached number one on the U.S. Adult Contemporary chart

1967
1967 record charts